Varian Medical Systems, Inc. v. Delfino, 35 Cal.4th 180 (2005) is a California Supreme Court opinion by then-Associate Justice Janice R. Brown interpreting the state's SLAPP statute.  Specifically, the case holds that an appeal from a denial of an anti-SLAPP motion stays all trial court proceedings: "The perfecting of an appeal from the denial of a special motion to strike automatically stays all further trial court proceedings on the merits upon the causes of action affected by the motion...you have a right not to be dragged through the courts because you exercised your constitutional rights."

Facts
In this case involving the arcana of appellate procedure, research scientists Michelangelo Delfino, Ph.D. and Mary E. Day filed an appeal from a $775,000 defamation judgment for tens of thousands of postings they made on their Website and on various Internet message boards criticizing their former employer, Varian Associates, renamed Varian Medical Systems in April 1999; two senior Varian Associates' executives, George A. Zdasiuk and Susan B. Felch; and a 1999 Varian Associates' spin off, Varian Semiconductor Equipment Associates, a high-tech corporation headquartered in Gloucester, Massachusetts. The judgment against Delfino and Day included a broad injunction ordering them not to "publish, post, or otherwise disseminate, directly or indirectly, on the Internet or elsewhere" 23 categories of statements that the trial court judge Jack Komar, and not the jury, found "untrue" and "false and defamatory."

In the fall of 2001 prior to the Santa Clara County Superior Court trial, Delfino and Day filed a special motion to strike Varian's complaint under California's Anti-SLAPP statute, Code of Civil Procedure section 425.16. The trial court denied the motion and Delfino and Day appealed from that denial, but the trial court and California Courts of Appeal refused to stay the trial under Code of Civil Procedure section 916 while the anti-SLAPP appeal was pending. At the conclusion of a seven-week jury trial the anti-SLAPP appeal was dismissed as moot.

Ruling
On appeal to the California Sixth District Court of Appeal, in November 2003 a three-judge panel rejected the argument that the trial court lacked subject matter jurisdiction to conduct the trial because of Delfino and Days' pending appeal from the denial of their anti-SLAPP motion.  On March 3, 2004, the California Supreme Court granted review to resolve the jurisdictional question: Does an appeal from the denial of a special motion to strike under the anti-SLAPP statute effect an automatic stay of the trial court proceedings? Three weeks after review was granted the Supreme Court stayed all of the plaintiffs' attempts to collect on the judgment and no compensation were ever collected from Delfino and Day.

On 3 March 2005, the Supreme Court held by a 7-0 vote that under Code of Civil Procedure section 916, "all of the matters on trial were embraced in and affected by defendants' appeal from the denial of that motion and the trial court lacked subject matter jurisdiction over those matters." By a 6-1 vote, Chief Justice Ronald M. George dissenting, the Supreme Court reversed the judgment, finding that the lack of subject matter jurisdiction in the trial court rendered the resulting trial completely void. The Supreme Court found that Delfino and Day's postings were simply "derogatory" and remanded the case back to the Santa Clara County Superior Court for a new trial where Komar was quickly disqualified as trial judge and replaced by the Honorable Jamie A. Jacobs-May.  On the eve of a second jury trial, in March 2006 with Jacobs-May presiding and with Delfino and Day in pro per, the case settled amicably and more than seven years of remarkably acrimonious litigation ended.

Amicus curiae briefs in support of Delfino and Day were filed in the Supreme Court by the California Attorney General, the California Newspaper Publishers Association with the Los Angeles Times, Oakland Tribune and San Francisco Chronicle, and the ACLU.  All four Varian plaintiffs represented by the Orrick, Herrington & Sutcliffe law firm and the Pillsbury Winthrop Shaw Pittman LLP failed to receive any amicus support.

External links
 Delfino and Day's U.S. Supreme Court Amicus Brief in support of Tory
 Delfino v. Agilent California Sixth District Court of Appeal opinion
 Horvitz & Levy LLP website discussion of Varian v. Delfino
 MoBeta Inc. Business Wire press release(s)
 Varian v. Delfino California Sixth District Court of Appeal opinion
Varian v. Delfino California Supreme Court opinion
Varian v. Delfino California Supreme Court study guide
 Varian v. Delfino California Supreme Court summary
 Yahoo! Finance Varian message board - The site of continuous derogatory exchanges between Delfino and possibly other supporters and Varian employees.

Further reading
 Anderson, Craig. Court Kills Web Defamation Verdict, Daily Journal, March 4, 2005
 Bay, Tina Company Held Immune from Tort Action Over Threats Employee Allegedly Made Through Work Computer, Metropolitan News-Enterprise, December 15, 2006
 Becker, Amanda 20 to Watch Under 40, Daily Journal, January 31, 2007
 Cummins, Erik Attorney Who Advocates for Public Access Wins Praise, March 16, 2005
 Delfino, Michelangelo and Mary E. Day. Be Careful Who You SLAPP, MoBeta Pub., 2002
 Eisenberg, Jon B. and Jeremy B. Rosen. Unmasking "crack_smoking_jesus": Do Internet Service Providers have a Tarasoff Duty to Divulge the Identity of a Subscriber Who is Making Death Threats?, 25 Hastings Comm. & Ent. LJ 683, 2003
 Hamm, Andrew F. Authors' Battle with Varian Puts Bookstores in the Middle, Business Journal, January 17, 2003
 Hasan, Najeeb. InterNot Free Speech, Metro, 3-27/4-02-2003
 Kravets, David. Calif. Justices´ Ruling Bodes Well for Online Speech, USA Today, March 4, 2005
 Lafferty, Shannon. Contempt Claim Brought in Internet Libel War, The Recorder, January 9, 2003
 Yeung, Bernice. Libel, or Liable to Make You Laugh?, San Francisco Weekly, December 5, 2001
 SLAPP Happy, Metroactive News & Issues, October 16-22, 2003

California state case law
2005 in United States case law
American Civil Liberties Union litigation
Strategic lawsuits against public participation
2005 in California
History of Santa Clara County, California